Three Nationwide Plaza is a  postmodern highrise building located at the address 3 Nationwide Plaza in Downtown Columbus, Ohio. The building is part of the larger multi-building complex known as Nationwide Plaza. Nationwide Plaza is the headquarters of Nationwide Mutual Insurance Company. Three Nationwide Plaza is the 10th tallest building in Columbus. Construction on the building finished in December 1988. The architect responsible was the NBBJ Group and the building design follows a postmodern style. The building was constructed for approximately $89 million and the main materials used were glass, steel, and precast concrete panels. 

The buildings that make up Nationwide Plaza are:

 One Nationwide Plaza, completed in 1977
 280 Plaza (also known as Two Nationwide), completed in 1981
 Three Nationwide Plaza, completed in 1988
 Four Nationwide Plaza, completed in 2000

See also

 List of tallest buildings in Columbus, Ohio

References

External links
 
 Skyscraperpage
 Emporis

Skyscraper office buildings in Columbus, Ohio
Buildings in downtown Columbus, Ohio
NBBJ buildings
Office buildings completed in 1988